The 2022 Pro Bowl was the National Football League all-star game for the 2021 NFL season. It was played at Allegiant Stadium in Paradise, Nevada, on February 6, 2022. ESPN, ABC and Disney XD had the national television rights. Voting for the game started on November 16. The entire roster was announced on December 22. Mike Vrabel from the Tennessee Titans coached the AFC team, while Matt LaFleur from the Green Bay Packers coached the NFC team. This was the most recent traditional Pro Bowl game, as the NFL announced a switch in format for the 2022 season that included several skill competitions and a flag football game.

Background
The league awarded the game to Allegiant Stadium, as a make-up for the 2021 Pro Bowl, which was originally scheduled to be held in that stadium before the COVID-19 pandemic forced alternative festivities to take place instead of an actual game. With the league expanding the regular season from a 16-game schedule to 17 games, the Pro Bowl was moved from the last weekend in January to the first weekend in February.

Summary

Box score

In the first quarter and a half, the NFC matched the AFC touchdown for touchdown, with the latter team leading by one due an unsuccessful two-point conversion after the NFC's second touchdown. After the AFC scored another touchdown before halftime, they continued to extend their lead in the third quarter with two more touchdowns, which gave them a 20-point lead at the end of that quarter. The NFC attempted a comeback, scoring 14 unanswered points in the fourth quarter, but the AFC took back and kept possession for the final two and a half minutes, securing their fifth consecutive Pro Bowl win.

Statistics

Starting lineups
Starting lineups are based on the lineups provided in the gamebook for the game. The only exception, since neither team ran their first play on offense with a fullback, is the fullback has been swapped out for the additional tight end for the NFC and additional wide receiver for the AFC.

AFC roster

Offense

Defense

Special teams

bold player who participated in game
 signifies the player has been selected as a captain
 Replacement player selection due to injury or vacancy
 Injured player; selected but did not participate
 Replacement Player; selected as reserve
 Selected but did not play because his team advanced to Super Bowl LVI (See Pro Bowl "Player Selection" section)
 Selected but chose not to participate
 Selected as starter, but relinquished that role

NFC roster

Offense

Defense

Special teams

bold player who participated in game
 signifies the player has been selected as a captain
 Replacement player selection due to injury or vacancy
 Injured player; selected but did not participate
 Replacement player; selected as reserve
 Selected but did not play because his team advanced to Super Bowl LVI (See Pro Bowl "Player Selection" section)
 Selected but chose not to participate
 Selected but did not play due to initially retiring

Number of selections per team

Broadcasting
The game was televised nationally in the United States by ESPN, and simulcast on ABC and Disney XD.

References

External links

2022
2021 National Football League season
2022 in American football
2022 in sports in Nevada
February 2022 sports events in the United States
American football in Las Vegas
Sports competitions in the Las Vegas Valley